The Commuters is an extant 1915 silent film comedy directed by George Fitzmaurice and starring Irene Fenwick in film debut.  It is based on a 1910 Broadway play, The Commuters, by James Forbes.

A copy of the film is held in the Library of Congress collection.

Plot

Cast
Irene Fenwick as Hetty Brice
Charles Judels as Professor Anatole Vermouth, aka Sammy
George Le Guere as Larry Brice
Dan Moyles as Mr. Rolliston
Della Connor as Fan Rolliston, wife
Agnes Marc as Carrie, A Maid
Dan Crimmins as Policeman
Marie Collins as The Mother-In-Law

References

External links

1915 films
American silent feature films
American films based on plays
Films directed by George Fitzmaurice
Silent American comedy films
1915 comedy films
American black-and-white films
1910s American films
1910s English-language films